Ali Khavari (22 March 1923 – 19 March 2021) was an Iranian communist politician and General Secretary of the Tudeh Party of Iran.

Career 
In 1984, he became First-Secretary of Tudeh Party of Iran, the party he joined in 1941. He was elected to the 'Central Committee' in the early 1960s, and on the eve of the 1979 revolution he was elected to the 'Political Committee' and the 'Secretariat of the Central Committee'.

References

First Secretaries of Tudeh Party of Iran
1923 births
2021 deaths
Central Committee of the Tudeh Party of Iran members